Alexandra Rutlidge (born 12 November 1988) is a British water polo player. She competed for Great Britain in the women's tournament at the 2012 Summer Olympics. This was the first ever Olympic GB women's water polo team.

References

External links
 
 
 

British female water polo players
Olympic water polo players of Great Britain
Water polo players at the 2012 Summer Olympics
1988 births
Living people